Imperial Bank Tower, also known as 701B, is the 25th tallest building in San Diego, California and is a prominent fixture in San Diego's skyline. The 24-story skyscraper has a height of 355 ft (108 m) and is located in the Core district of Downtown San Diego and was constructed in 1982.

See also
List of tallest buildings in San Diego

External links 

Skyscraper office buildings in San Diego
1982 establishments in California
Office buildings completed in 1982